Corentin Jacob (born 7 January 1997) is a French professional footballer. Jacob is a former French youth international.

Career
Jacob joined the training centre of Stade Brestois 29 aged 12. He signed his first professional contract with the club in May 2015, for three years, effective from 1 July 2015. He made his professional debut for the club on 6 November 2015, coming on as a late substitute in the 3–0 Ligue 2 win against Tours FC.

In January 2018, he joined FC Bastia-Borgo on loan in Championnat National 2 until the end of the season, in order to get extra playing time.

In January 2019, he was loaned to Tours in Championnat National until the end of the season. Whilst at Tours he scored his first senior goal, in the 1–1 draw with US Quevilly-Rouen on 29 March 2019.

In June 2019, despite having one year remaining on his Brest contract, Jacob signed for newly-promoted Ligue 2 side Rodez AF, on an initial one-year contract, with option to extend if relegation was avoided. In July 2020 he extended his contract with Rodez until 2022, and joined Sporting Club Lyon on loan in the Championnat National for the 2020–21 season. On 16 July 2021, he joined Concarneau on a season-long loan.

References

Living people
1997 births
Sportspeople from Brest, France
Association football midfielders
French footballers
France youth international footballers
Ligue 2 players
Championnat National players
Championnat National 2 players
Championnat National 3 players
Stade Brestois 29 players
FC Bastia-Borgo players
Tours FC players
Rodez AF players
Lyon La Duchère players
US Concarneau players
Footballers from Brittany